CZ, C-Z, C/Z, or Cz may refer to:

 Czech Republic, ISO 3166 country code CZ
 .cz, internet country code top-level domain for the Czech Republic

Businesses and organisations
 C/Z Records, an American record label
 Česká zbrojovka firearms (ČZ)
 Česká zbrojovka Uherský Brod, a Czech firearms manufacturer 
 CZ-USA, U.S. division
 Česká zbrojovka Strakonice (ČZ a.s.), a Czech manufacturer of forklifts and formerly motorcycles and firearms
 Cizeta, an Italian car manufacturer named for its founder, Claudio Zampolli (C.Z.)
 China Southern Airlines, IATA airline designator CZ

Science and technology
 Cubic zirconia, a synthetic gemstone
 Haplogroup CZ (mtDNA), in human mitochondrial genetics
 Controlled Z gate, a type of Quantum logic gate 
 Long March (rocket family), or Chang Zheng
 Cz, an EEG electrode site according to the 10-20 system
 Changpeng Zhao, founder and CEO of cryptocurrency exchange Binance

Other uses
 Cz (digraph), in the Polish language
 Casa Zimbabwe, a student housing unit in Berkeley, California, U.S.
 Citizendium, an online encyclopedia project
 CZ, vehicle registration prefix of Province of Catanzaro, Italy
 Cz, a character from Scrapped Princess

See also